Upper Hulme is a hamlet situated in North Staffordshire, between the historical market town of Leek and the spa town of Buxton. It is clustered around a redundant mill and is located within the upper reaches of the River Churnet. The Mill was recently restored, complete with a working water wheel, but no further information on its future is known. It can be accessed by one of the many footpaths through the hamlet. The Peak District Boundary Walk runs through the village.

The hamlet is at the edge of the Peak District and is home to The Roaches and is therefore very popular with ramblers, climbers and hikers alike. The A53 road offers access to Tittesworth reservoir in the south and Ramshaw Rocks in the North, making the hamlet a popular base for walking holidays. There is a camp site, bunkhouse accommodation and holiday cottages available.

The hamlet is popular with wildlife enthusiasts due to Wallaby having been sighted on the Roaches, and the successful annual breeding of peregrine falcons. In Peregrine breeding season, a 'bird watching post' is set up at the foot of Hen Cloud and park rangers are on hand to offer advice and information on the bird. At this time of year, some access is restricted.

The hamlet has two local pubs; Ye Olde Rock Inn and The Winking Man. It is also home to a popular Tea Rooms. The main industry of the hamlet is agricultural. Upon entrance to the hamlet there is an old Dye Works, which has now been transformed into offices and workshops.

Until 2005 the area was used by the British Army as a training area. That space has now been vacated by the Ministry of Defence and is currently for sale.

See also
Listed buildings in Leekfrith

References

External links

Hamlets in Staffordshire
Towns and villages of the Peak District
Staffordshire Moorlands